Rasuwa Fort or Rasuwa Gadhi is a historical fort ruin in the Rasuwa District of Nepal roughly at the border with Tibet, China.

A trekking permit obtained in Kathmandu will allow tourists to visit the border, but not to cross the bridge into Tibet.

History

The area was the site of a three-day battle during the second campaign of Sino-Nepalese War in July 1792. In 1855 during the Rana dynasty when Jung Bahadur Rana invaded Qing-ruled Tibet in Nepalese–Tibetan War, the fort was constructed on the site.

In 2012, Nepal and China agreed to open new border crossings, Rasuwagadhi site being one of the crossings. The fort was damaged during the construction of border crossing in 2013. In December 2014, the port of entry was opened near the fort. This route between China (via Gyirong Town / Kyirong on the Chinese side) and Nepal was considered to be more reliable than the crossing through Zhangmu–Kodari.

References

Buildings and structures in Rasuwa District
Forts in Nepal
China–Nepal border crossings
1855 establishments in Nepal